P-boxes and probability bounds analysis have been used in many applications spanning many disciplines in engineering and environmental science, including:
 Engineering design
 Expert elicitation
 Analysis of species sensitivity distributions
 Sensitivity analysis in aerospace engineering of the buckling load of the frontskirt of the Ariane 5 launcher
 ODE models of chemical reactor dynamics
 Pharmacokinetic variability of inhaled VOCs
 Groundwater modeling
 Bounding failure probability for series systems
 Heavy metal contamination in soil at an ironworks brownfield
 Uncertainty propagation for salinity risk models
 Power supply system safety assessment
 Contaminated land risk assessment
 Engineered systems for drinking water treatment
 Computing soil screening levels
 Human health and ecological risk analysis by the U.S. EPA of PCB contamination at the Housatonic River Superfund site
 Environmental assessment for the Calcasieu Estuary Superfund site
 Aerospace engineering for supersonic nozzle thrust
 Verification and validation in scientific computation for engineering problems
 Toxicity to small mammals of environmental mercury contamination
 Modeling travel time of pollution in groundwater
 Reliability analysis
 Endangered species assessment for reintroduction of Leadbeater's possum
 Exposure of insectivorous birds to an agricultural pesticide
 Climate change projections
 Waiting time in queuing systems
 Extinction risk analysis for spotted owl on the Olympic Peninsula
 Biosecurity against introduction of invasive species or agricultural pests
 Finite-element structural analysis
 Cost estimates  
 Nuclear stockpile certification
 Fracking risks to water pollution
 Space Trajectory Optimisation
 Asteroid Impact Probability 
References

Probability bounds analysis